The Earth Will Swallow You is a film by brothers Geoffrey and Christopher Hanson detailing the summer 2000 tour of Athens, Georgia-based jam band Widespread Panic, though a substantial portion of the film is behind-the-scenes footage of studio sessions, travelling, and interviews.  It includes footage from their performances at larger venues such as the Red Rocks Amphitheatre and San Francisco's Warfield Theater.  There are also several clips from smaller venues and impromptu settings (New York City's Central Park).  Much of the concert footage highlights their appearances with other artists, including Taj Mahal, the Dirty Dozen Brass Band, Jorma Kaukonen, Merl Saunders, and Cecil "P-Nut" Daniels.  Most of these artists are given a brief interview segment as well.  Perhaps the real highlights of the film are the rare glimpses into the band's life off the road.  Much attention is given to their recording in various studios (John Keane's studio, where many of their albums were recorded, bassist Dave Schools's house), time spent with artists close to the band (Vic Chesnutt, Col. Bruce Hampton), and, more importantly, one-on-one interviews with each member of the group.

Chapter Index
Opening Titles
TEWSY I
Col. Bruce
Chilly Water
Oade Brother
Dave
Walking with Tom
Driving I
TEWSY II
Rolling
Mikey
Rehearsing with Jorma
Vermont Radio
Arleen
North
Master Set List
Keep on Trekking
Dirty Dozen
TEWSY III
Driving II
Set Break
Cooking with Taj
Genesis
Action Man
P-Nut
Todd
Drums
Sunny
JoJo
Merl
End of the Show
My Last Act
Surprise Valley
Closing Credits

Personnel

Widespread Panic
 John Bell
 John "JoJo" Hermann
 Todd Nance
 Domingo S. Ortiz
 Dave Schools
 Michael Houser

Guest appearances
 David Blackmon
 Eric Carter
 Vic Chesnutt
 Cecil "P-Nut" Daniels
 Dirty Dozen Brass Band
 Col. Bruce Hampton
 Daniel Hutchins
 Jerry Joseph
 Jorma Kaukonen
 Taj Mahal
 Merl Saunders

Production
 Director – Christopher Hanson
 Producer – Geoffrey Hanson
 Executive Producer – Jud Blount
 Co-Executive Producer – Peter Couhig
 Co-Producer – Mitchell Stein
 Associate Producers – William Blount, Drew Hamilton, Chris Wilson
 Editor – David Frankel
 Sound Mix – John Keane and Andy Kris
 Production Manager and Marketing Coordinator - David Dean
 DVD Producers – Geoffrey Hanson and Christopher Hanson
 DVD Menus – Sean Sutton and Chicago Recording Company
 Package Photography – Garrett Hacking
 Poster Art – Jason Clements
 Package Design – Mark Berger/Madison House Design

2002 films
Concert films
Widespread Panic video albums